The 1895 West Cavan by-election was a parliamentary by-election held for the United Kingdom House of Commons constituency of West Cavan on 22 August 1895. The sitting member, Edmund Vesey Knox of the Irish National Federation, who had sat for the constituency since a by-election in 1890, had been re-elected in the general election of 1895. However, having been elected also for the constituency of Londonderry City, he chose to sit for that constituency instead. The West Cavan seat thus became vacant, and in the ensuing by-election, another Irish National Federation candidate, James Patrick Farrell, was elected unopposed.

References

1895 elections in the United Kingdom
August 1895 events
By-elections to the Parliament of the United Kingdom in County Cavan constituencies
Unopposed by-elections to the Parliament of the United Kingdom in Irish constituencies
1895 elections in Ireland